United Nations Security Council resolution 735, was adopted without a vote on 29 January 1992, after examining the application of Armenia for membership in the United Nations. The Council recommended to the General Assembly that Armenia be admitted.

Armenia officially became a member of the United Nations on 2 March 1992.

See also
 Armenia and the United Nations
 List of United Nations Security Council Resolutions 701 to 800 (1991–1993)
 Member states of the United Nations
 Permanent Mission of Armenia to the United Nations
 United Nations Office in Armenia

References

External links
 Text of the Resolution at undocs.org
 

 0735
 0735
 0735
January 1992 events
1992 in Armenia